Ichthyosaura is a genus of newts in the family Salamandridae, found in Europe. It contains one extant species: the alpine newt (Ichthyosaura alpestris). One fossil species from the Miocene, Ichthyosaura randeckensis, has also been referred to this genus, although this has been challenged.

The species is gonochoric and reproduce sexually.

The alpine newt was long included in Triturus along with most other European newts. As this genus was found to contain several distinct evolutionary lineages, the alpine newt was split off as genus Mesotriton in 2004. However, the name Ichthyosaura was published earlier and is now accepted as the valid genus name for the alpine newt, while Mesotriton is a junior synonym.

"Ichthyosaura", Greek for "fish lizard", refers to a nymph-like creature in classical mythology.

References

Newts
Taxa named by Pierre André Latreille
Amphibians of Europe
Amphibian genera